Dogana is a town and a civil parish (curazia), whose name means "Customs House"; it is located in the north-eastern corner of San Marino in the Serravalle municipality ("castello"). The town is the most populated settlement in the republic.

Geography
The town is situated at the northernmost point of San Marino after Falciano, close to the border with Italy (at Cerasolo Ausa, a frazione of Coriano, in the province of Rimini).

History
It has a population of roughly 7,000. Due to its size, in 2006 it asked to split away from Serravalle and become its own castello, but in 2007 the proposal was refused. Partial autonomy is reflected in Dogana's having its own postal code (47891), while the rest of Serravalle carries the designation 47899.

Economy
Dogana is the main entry point for travellers arriving into San Marino from Italy (by freeway no. 72 from Rimini). Although Dogana means customs house in Italian, there are no border formalities anywhere on the border between Italy and San Marino.

Sport
The local football team is the Juvenes.

Image gallery

See also
Stadio Olimpico (San Marino)
Serravalle
Cà Ragni
Cinque Vie
Falciano
Lesignano
Ponte Mellini
Rovereta
Valgiurata

References

External links

Curazie in San Marino
Italy–San Marino border crossings
Serravalle (San Marino)